Bert Kalmar (February 10, 1884 – September 18, 1947) was an American songwriter, who was inducted into the Songwriters Hall of Fame in 1970. He was also a screenwriter.

Biography
Kalmar, a native of  New York City, left school at an early age and began working in vaudeville. He appeared on stage as a magician, comedian and dancer before switching to songwriting, after a knee injury ended his performing career. By this time, he had earned enough to start a music publishing company, Kalmar and Puck, where he collaborated with a number of songwriters, including Harry Puck (1891–1964) and Harry Ruby. The publishing firm also operated under the name Kalmar, Puck, Abrahams, Consolidated, Inc., the other named partner being  Maurice Abrahams (1883–1931)

By 1918, Kalmar and Ruby had formed a permanent songwriting team. Together, they wrote the musical score for the Marx Brothers' stage production of Animal Crackers (1928) and subsequent film version. Their songs were also featured in the Marx Brothers' films Horse Feathers (1932) and Duck Soup (1933). Kalmar's partnership with Ruby was portrayed in the 1950 Metro-Goldwyn-Mayer musical Three Little Words, starring Fred Astaire and Red Skelton. Kalmar did, however, occasionally work with Oscar Hammerstein II, Ted Snyder and other songwriters.

Bert Kalmar was married to Jessie Brown, with whom he had two children. The couple were later divorced.

He died in Los Angeles, California and was interred at Forest Lawn Cemetery in Glendale, California.

Works
Broadway 
Ziegfeld Follies of 1920 (1920) - revue - featured co-songwriter for "I'm a Vamp from East Broadway"
Helen of Troy, New York (1923) - co-composer and co-lyricist with Harry Ruby
Ziegfeld Follies of 1923 (1923) - revue - featured lyricist for "Society Bud"
No Other Girl (1924) - co-composer and co-lyricist with Harry Ruby
Holka Polka (1925) - book-editor
The Ramblers (1926) - co-composer, co-lyricist, and co-bookwriter with Harry Ruby
Lucky (1927) - co-writer with Otto Harbach, Harry Ruby and Jerome Kern
The Five O'Clock Girl (1927) and (1981 revival) - lyricist with composer Harry Ruby
She's My Baby (1928) - co-bookwriter with Harry Ruby
Top Speed (1929) - co-writer and co-producer with Harry Ruby and Guy Bolton
High Kickers (1941) - co-composer, co-lyricist with Harry Ruby and co-bookwriter with Ruby and George Jessel
The Corn is Green (1943) - actor in the role of "Will Hughes"
Fosse (1999) - revue - featured lyricist for "Who's Sorry Now?"

Notable songs
"Who's Sorry Now?" (1923), Kalmar and Ruby's first big hit
"I Wanna Be Loved by You" (1928), a hit for Helen Kane, known as the "Boop-boop-a-doop girl", and sung by Marilyn Monroe in the film Some Like It Hot
"Hooray for Captain Spaulding" from Animal Crackers (1928): became Groucho Marx's signature tune.
"I Love You So Much" (1928)
"Three Little Words" (1930), their biggest hit.
"Nevertheless" (1931), a hit for both Bing Crosby and Rudy Vallée, later done by The Mills Brothers and Frank Sinatra
"I'm Against It", "I Always Get My Man" and "Everyone Says I Love You" from Horse Feathers (1932)
"Hail, Hail Freedonia" from Duck Soup (1933)
"What a Perfect Combination" (1932), lyrics by Kalmar and Irving Caesar, music by Ruby and Harry Akst, written for the Broadway show The Kid, starring Eddie Cantor
"A Kiss to Build a Dream On" (1935), their last hit
"The Real McCoys" (1957-1963), television theme (words & music by Harry Ruby)

See also
:Category:Songs with lyrics by Bert Kalmar

References

External links
 
 
 Bert Kalmar at the Sheet Music Consortium
 
 
 
 Bert Kalmar recordings at the Discography of American Historical Recordings.

1884 births
1947 deaths
Burials at Forest Lawn Memorial Park (Glendale)
Jewish American songwriters
Songs with lyrics by Bert Kalmar
Vaudeville performers